Pterostoma is a genus of moths belonging to the family Notodontidae.

The species of this genus are found in Eurasia.

Species:
 Pterostoma grisea Bremer, 1861 
 Pterostoma hoenei Kiriakoff, 1963 
 Pterostoma gigantinum Staudinger, 1892 - China, Korea, Japan, East Russia 
 Pterostoma palpina (Clerck, 1759) -  Europe and Central Asia
 Pterostoma sinica Moore, 1877

References

Notodontidae
Noctuoidea genera